Gymnomyza is a genus of birds, in the honeyeater family Meliphagidae, which are restricted to a few islands in the southwest Pacific Ocean.

There are four species.
 Crow honeyeater (Gymnomyza aubryana)
 Mao (Gymnomyza samoensis)
 Yellow-billed honeyeater (Gymnomyza viridis)
 Giant honeyeater (Gymnomyza brunneirostris)

External links 
 Itis: Gymnomyza 
  Mao
  Giant forest honeyeater

 
Bird genera
Birds of the Pacific Ocean
Meliphagidae
Taxa named by Anton Reichenow